The 2015 Albanian Cup Final was a football match played on 29 May 2015 to decide the winner of the 2014–15 Albanian Cup, the 63rd edition of Albania's primary football cup.

The match, contested by FK Kukësi and KF Laçi, took place on 29 May 2015 at Qemal Stafa Stadium in Tiranë, and kicked off at 20:00 p.m. It was the second time either club had reached the final of the Albanian Cup, with KF Laçi having won the 2012–13 Albanian Cup Final against Bylis Ballsh and FK Kukësi having lost to Flamurtari Vlorë in the 2013–14 Albanian Cup Final. KF Laçi won the game through a Segun Adeniyi winner to win the Albanian Cup for a second time in their history and a second time. In Albania, the match was televised by TVSH and SuperSport.

The first goal of the game was scored by Emiljano Veliaj through a free kick in the 29th minute, and Edon Hasani scored the equaliser just before half time, with Segun Adeniyi scoring the winning goal in the 61st minute. The competition winners were awarded a place in the first qualifying round of the 2015–16 Europa League competition.

Match

Details

References

Cup Final
2015
Albanian Cup
Sports competitions in Tirana
Albanian Cup Final, 2015
Albanian Cup Final, 2015